Stewart Nigel Clifford Murch (27 June 1944 – 15 July 2020) was an Australian cricketer active from 1966 to 1970 who played for Northamptonshire and Victoria.

Born in Warrnambool, Victoria, Murch appeared in ten first-class matches as a right arm fast bowler and right-handed batsman. He took 17 wickets with a best performance of three for 49, and scored 215 runs with a highest score of 64.

He died on 15 July 2020 at the age of 76. He was the father-in-law of Cathy Freeman, Australia's 400m Olympic gold medallist.

See also
 List of Victoria first-class cricketers

References

1944 births
2020 deaths
Australian cricketers
Northamptonshire cricketers
Victoria cricketers
People from Warrnambool
Cricketers from Victoria (Australia)